The 15th Congress of the All-Union Communist Party (Bolsheviks) was held during 2–19 December 1927 in Moscow.  It was attended by 898 delegates with a casting vote and 771 with a consultative vote.

History

Background

In October 1927, the last Left Opposition members were expelled from the Central Committee elected by the 14th Congress, and in November 1927 Leon Trotsky and Grigory Zinoviev were expelled from the Party itself.

Repudiation of the United Opposition

The 15th Congress of the All-Union Communist Party (Bolsheviks) was convened in Moscow on 2 December 1927. This marked the first Soviet Communist Party Congress in two years, this despite the fact that party regulations called for annual meetings. The gathering was retrospectively remembered as the "Congress of the Collectivization of Agriculture and of the Socialist Offensive on All Fronts" in the official party history of 1962, although a major part of time spent by the gathering related to internal party politics and the final ritualistic repudiation of the United Opposition of Trotsky, Zinoviev, and their supporters, effectively ending a two-year factional war.

Oppositionists Christian Rakovsky and Lev Kamenev held brief speeches in front of the Congress. Rakovsky's speech was interrupted fifty-seven times by his opponents, including Nikolai Bukharin, Martemyan Ryutin, and Lazar Kaganovich. Although, unlike Rakovsky, Kamenev used the occasion to appeal for reconciliation, he was nevertheless interrupted twenty-four times by the same group.

Theses on Industrialization

The Central Committee adopted a set of theses regarding industrialization which had been prepared in October 1927 by the Central Committee.

Election of a new Central Committee

The 15th Congress elected a new Central Committee to govern activities of the Communist Party during the period in between Congresses.

Central Committee: 71 members, 50 candidates to Central Committee membership
Central Revision Commission: 9 members
Central Control Commission: 195 members

Footnotes

Further reading

 J.V. Stalin, The Fifteenth Congress of the CPSU(b), 2-19 December 1927, Works: Volume 10. Moscow: Foreign Languages Publishing House, 1954 pp. 275–382.

External links
 Report of the Fifteenth Congress of the Communist Party of the Soviet Union, described as "official report with decisions and discussions."
 Fifteenth Congress of the All-Union Communist Party (Bolshevik) at the Great Soviet Encyclopedia (1979)

Communist Party of the Soviet Union 14
Congress
1927 conferences
December 1927 events